Elliston Ridge Air Station (ID: N-22B, C-22B) was a General Surveillance Gap Filler Radar station in the Canadian province of Newfoundland and Labrador, It was located  north-northwest of St. John's.  It was closed in 1961.

History
The site was established in 1943 as a United States Army anti-aircraft spotting station (Codename: Duo) with an SCR-271 early warning radar. Fifty-two members (three officers and 49 enlisted men) of the 685th Air Warning Company were stationed at Elliston from winter 1943 to November 1944. 

In 1957 a manned Gap Filler radar station was constructed, funded by the United States Air Force, under operational control of Red Cliff Air Station and part of Pinetree Line of Ground-Control Intercept (GCI) radar sites.

The station was assigned to Aerospace Defense Command in 1957, and was given designation "N-22B" (later "C-22B)." Aerospace Defense Command stationed the 642d Aircraft Control and Warning Squadron at the station in 1957.  It operated an AN/FPS-14 manned Gap Filler search radar.

USAF units and assignments 
Units:
 642d Aircraft Control and Warning Squadron, 1957
 Inactivated 1 October 1961

Assignments:
 4731st Air Defense Group, 1 April 1957
 Goose Air Defense Sector, 6 June 1960 – 1 October 1961

References

 Cornett, Lloyd H. and Johnson, Mildred W., A Handbook of Aerospace Defense Organization  1946 - 1980, Office of History, Aerospace Defense Center, Peterson AFB, CO (1980)
 Winkler, David F. & Webster, Julie L., Searching the Skies, The Legacy of the United States Cold War Defense Radar Program,  US Army Construction Engineering Research Laboratories, Champaign, IL (1997)

Radar stations of the United States Air Force
Installations of the United States Air Force in Canada
Military installations closed in 1961
Military installations in Newfoundland and Labrador
Military installations established in 1957
1957 establishments in Newfoundland and Labrador
1961 disestablishments in Newfoundland and Labrador